Sutton cum Duckmanton is a civil parish in the North East Derbyshire district of Derbyshire, England. The parish contains eleven listed buildings that are recorded in the National Heritage List for England.  Of these, one is listed at Grade I, the highest of the three grades, one is at Grade II*, the middle grade, and the others are at Grade II, the lowest grade.  The parish contains the villages of Sutton Scarsdale and Long Duckmanton and the surrounding countryside.  The most important building is Sutton Scarsdale Hall, a ruined country house, which is listed together with associated structures.  The other listed buildings consist of a church, houses, farmhouses and farmbuildings, and an ice house.


Key

Buildings

References

Citations

Sources

 

Lists of listed buildings in Derbyshire